The Lutheran Church–Missouri Synod Foundation is the investment and trust administration corporation for the Lutheran Church–Missouri Synod (LCMS). The LCMS Foundation serves the LCMS, the Concordia University System, the congregations, schools, seminaries, districts, Recognized Service Organizations, and other affiliated service organizations of the LCMS. In its role of supporting the LCMS, the LCMS Foundation provides investment management services and donor counseling for bequests, endowments, charitable gift annuities, donor advised funds, and other charitable trust funds.

History
The LCMS Foundation was established on December 8, 1958 for the purpose of receiving gifts of property and other non-cash assets on behalf of the LCMS. The Foundation was led by Rev. E. R. Bertermann, who served as its first executive director.

At first, the LCMS Foundation received subsidies from the LCMS. However, beginning in 1968 the LCMS Foundation became self-sustaining.

Beginning in 1979, the LCMS Foundation assisted in raising direct gifts to purchase property and construction of a new headquarters for the LCMS. This building, located in Kirkwood, Missouri, is known as the LCMS International Center.

The 1981 LCMS Convention created for the first time the position of president to oversee the LCMS Foundation. The Foundation president also served as Vice–President, Finance/Treasurer of the LCMS. Dr. Norm Sell jointly held these positions of Foundation President and Vice–President, Finance/Treasurer of the LCMS until 1992 when the positions were split as a result of the 1992 Synod convention.

In 2001 the LCMS Foundation switched from managing its own investments to employing Wilshire Associates to assist in locating outside fund managers to do the investing.

From 2000 to 2013 the LCMS Foundation provided development services to The LCMS, KFUO Radio, LCMS Joint Seminary Fund, LCMS World Mission, LCMS World Relief and Human Care, Lutheran Housing Support, and the Concordia University System. Beginning in 2013, all direct gift fund raising activity was done directly by the LCMS.

Executive Directors and Presidents 
E. R. Bertermann
Fred Precht
J. David Heino
Otto A. Dorn
Norman Sell
Mark Stuenkel
Thomas Ries
David Fiedler

Supporting Ministries
Since the LCMS Foundation was established in 1958, it has distributed more than $1.1 billion in gifts.

In fiscal year 2016, the LCMS Foundation distributed $29.8 million to 868 ministries, including congregations, schools, the Seminaries, and other ministry organizations named by donors. 

The LCMS Foundation manages the John and Harriet Wiebe Mission Advancement Fund that provides grants to LCMS ministries and LCMS Recognized Service Organizations to assist mission outreach, new church plants, and children/youth ministries.

The LCMS Foundation provides development training courses that equip people to help supporters of various LCMS ministries create charitable planned gifts. Successful completion of the courses provides participants with certification in Gift Development and Stewardship for Christian nonprofit organizations.

References

External links 
 LCMS Foundation Website

Lutheran Church–Missouri Synod
Religious charities based in the United States
Lutheran organizations
Charities based in Missouri